The jinghu (京胡; pinyin: jīnghú) is a Chinese bowed string instrument in the huqin family, used primarily in Beijing opera. It is the smallest and highest pitched instrument in the huqin family. The jinghu has a tone similar to a violin but raspier.

Construction
Like most of its relatives, the jinghu has 2 strings that are customarily tuned to the interval of a 5th which the hair of the non-detachable bow passes in between.  The strings were formerly made of silk, but in modern times are increasingly made of steel or nylon. Unlike other huqin instruments (erhu, gaohu, zhonghu, etc.) it is made of bamboo.  Its cylindrical soundbox is covered with snakeskin on the front (playing) end, which forms a taut drum on which the bridge rests, sandwiched between the drum and the strings, which are connected to a peg at the bottom of the soundbox.

Use
In Beijing opera, the jinghu often doubles the singer's voice. Jinghu performers in Beijing opera rarely shift into higher positions, and instead choose to compress the melody into a single octave.

The jinghu was also featured prominently in the single "Shinjitsu no Uta" by the Japanese band Do as Infinity.

See also
Huqin
Music of China
Traditional Chinese musical instruments
String instruments

References

External links
Current profile  of Wu Ru-Jun (Beijing opera musician who played the jinghu in Shinjitsu no Uta) from his official website. Includes information about parts of a jinghu and Beijing opera.
Zongti Lin's blog  A blog of another Beijing opera musician, with videos on the Beijing opera and jinghu lessons.

Chinese musical instruments
Drumhead lutes
Peking opera
Huqin family instruments